Romain Lopez, (born 1989) is a French politician and the mayor of Moissac.

Biography 
He was born in Moissac in 1989 and holds a master's degree in political science and another in history.

Romain Lopez joined the Front National (since 2018 National Rally) at the end of 2013. Running as the National Rally candidate, he was elected mayor of Moissac on 28 June 2020.

References

1989 births
Mayors of places in Occitania (administrative region)
National Rally (France) politicians
Living people
21st-century French politicians